Volker Boulevard or Volker is a major west/east main street that runs along U.S. Route 56 in Kansas City, Missouri. It starts at Ward Parkway and Brookside Boulevard near the Country Club Plaza along Brush Creek and ends at Swope Parkway and Paseo Boulevard.

Streets in Kansas City, Missouri
Transportation in Kansas City, Missouri